This is list of free-trade agreements between two sides, where each side could be a country (or other customs territory), a trade bloc or an informal group of countries.

Note: Every customs union, common market, economic union, customs and monetary union and economic and monetary union is also a free-trade area.

For fully multilateral agreements (not included below) see: List of multilateral free-trade agreements.

For a general explanation, see free-trade area.

Operating agreements

List of agreements between two states, two blocs or a bloc and a state.

Afghanistan 
Afghanistan has bilateral agreements with the following countries and blocs:

 India
 Pakistan

Armenia
Armenia has bilateral agreements with the following countries and blocs:
 Commonwealth of Independent States
Belarus
Kazakhstan
Kyrgyzstan
Moldova
Russia
Turkmenistan
Tajikistan
Uzbekistan
Eurasian Economic Union
Eurasian Customs Union members
Vietnam free trade agreement
China trade and economic agreement
Iran free trade agreement
Serbia free trade agreement
Singapore free trade agreement
European Union Armenia qualifies to export its products under the EU's Generalized System of Preferences (GSP)
Georgia
Ukraine
United States Armenia qualifies to export its products under the U.S. Generalized System of Preferences (GSP) program

ASEAN

ASEAN  has bilateral agreements with the following countries and blocs:
 ASEAN–China Free Trade Area (ACFTA), in effect as of 1 January 2010
 ASEAN–Hong Kong, China Free Trade Agreement (AHKFTA)
 ASEAN–India Free Trade Area (AIFTA), in effect as of 1 January 2010
 ASEAN–Japan Comprehensive Economic Partnership (AJCEP), in effect as of 1 December 2008
 ASEAN–Korea Free Trade Area (AKFTA), in effect as of 1 January 2010
 ASEAN–Australia–New Zealand Free Trade Area (AANZFTA), in effect as of 1 January 2010

Australia 
Australia has bilateral agreements with the following countries:

 Chile
 China
 Hong Kong
 India
 Indonesia (Indonesia–Australia Comprehensive Economic Partnership Agreement)
 Japan
 Malaysia
 New Zealand
 Papua New Guinea
 Peru
 Singapore
 South Korea
 Thailand
 United States
 United Kingdom

Azerbaijan
Azerbaijan has bilateral agreements with the following countries and blocs:

 Georgia
 Kazakhstan
 Moldova
 Russia
 Turkmenistan
 Ukraine
 Uzbekistan

Bhutan 
Bhutan has bilateral agreements with the following countries and blocs:

 India

Brunei 
Brunei has bilateral agreements with the following countries and blocs:

 Japan

CARICOM
Caribbean Community (CARICOM) has bilateral agreements with the following countries:
 Costa Rica
 Dominican Republic
 Chile
Australia
Bolivia
Canada
Central America (Costa Rica, El Salvador, Honduras. Guatemala and Nicaragua)
China
Colombia
Cuba
Ecuador
EFTA (Iceland, Liechtenstein, Norway and Switzerland)
European Union
Hong Kong SAR
India
Japan
Malaysia
MERCOSUR (Argentina, Brazil, Paraguay, Uruguay and Venezuela)
Mexico
Panama
Peru
Trans-Pacific Strategic Economic Partnership (Brunei, Chile, New Zealand and Singapore)
Turkey
South Korea
United States
Vietnam

China, People's Republic of China

The People's Republic of China has bilateral trade agreements with the following blocs, countries, and its two special administrative regions:
 Hong Kong, Mainland and Hong Kong Closer Economic Partnership Arrangement (CEPA) (2003)
 Macau, Mainland and Macau Closer Economic Partnership Arrangement (CEPA) (2003)
 Chile, China-Chile Free Trade Agreement (2006)
 Pakistan, China-Pakistan Free Trade Agreement (2006)
 New Zealand, China-New Zealand Free Trade Agreement (2008)
 Singapore, China-Singapore Free Trade Agreement (2009)
 ASEAN, China-ASEAN Free Trade Area (2010)
 Republic of China (Taiwan), Economic Cooperation Framework Agreement (2010)
 Peru, China-Peru Free Trade Agreement (2010)
 Costa Rica, China-Costa Rica Free Trade Agreement (2011)
 Iceland, China-Iceland Free Trade Agreement (2014)
 Switzerland, China-Switzerland free trade agreement (2014)
 Australia, China-Australia Free Trade Agreement (2015)
 South Korea, China-South Korea Free Trade Agreement (2015)
 Georgia, China-Georgia Free Trade Agreement (2017)

Colombia
Colombia has bilateral agreements with the following countries and blocs (date it took effect):
Canada (15 August 2011)
CARICOM (1 May 1995)
Chile (8 May 2009)
Costa Rica (29 July 2016)
EFTA:
Iceland (1 October 2014)
Liechtenstein-Switzerland (1 July 2011)
Norway (1 September 2014)
European Union (5 November 2014)
Israel (11 August 2020)
South Korea (30 June 2016)
Mexico (1 January 1995)
Northern Triangle:
Guatemala (12 November 2009)
El Salvador (1 February 2010)
Honduras (27 March 2010)
Pacific Alliance (1 May 2016)
United States, United States–Colombia Free Trade Agreement (15 May 2012)

Costa Rica

Costa Rica has bilateral agreements with the following countries and blocs (date it took effect):
 Canada (1 November 2002)
 Chile (15 February 2002)
 People's Republic of China (1 August 2011)
 Caribbean Community (CARICOM) (15 November 2005)
 Trinidad and Tobago (15 November 2005)
 Guyana (30 April 2006)
 Barbados (1 August 2006)
 Belize (10 March 2011)
 Jamaica (1 June 2015)
Still awaiting approval from:
 Suriname
 Antigua and Barbuda
 Dominica
 Grenada
 Saint Kitts and Nevis
 Saint Lucia
 Saint Vincent and the Grenadines
 Colombia (1 August 2016).
 Dominican Republic (7 March 2002)
 EFTA (2 May 2014).
 Norway (20 August 2014)
 Switzerland (29 August 2014)
 Liechtenstein (29 August 2014)
 Iceland (5 September 2014)
 El Salvador Customs union, (1963, re-launched on 29 October 1993)
 European Union (October 1, 2013).
 Guatemala Customs union, (1963, re-launched on 29 October 1993)
 Honduras Customs union, (1963, re-launched on 29 October 1993)
 Mexico (January 1, 1995)
 Nicaragua Customs union, (1963, re-launched on 29 October 1993)
 Panama (31 July 1973, renegotiated and expanded for (1 January 2009)
 Peru (1 June 2013)
 Singapore (16 May 2013).
 South Korea (6 March 2019)
United States (1 January 2009)

Eurasian Economic Union 

The Eurasian Economic Union consisting of Russia, Belarus, Kazakhstan, Armenia and Kyrgyzstan has following free trade agreements, see further here.
Moldova (2013)
Uzbekistan (2014)
Egypt (2015)
Tajikistan (2016)
Vietnam (2016)
China (2019)
Serbia (2019)
Singapore (2019)
Iran (2021)

European Free Trade Association

EFTA has bilateral agreements with the following countries – including dependent territories – and blocs:
 Albania
 Canada: Canada–European Free Trade Association Free Trade Agreement
 Chile
 Colombia
 Costa Rica
Georgia
 Gulf Cooperation Council (GCC)
 Faroe Islands (autonomous entity of Denmark)
 Egypt
 Hong Kong
 Israel
 Indonesia
 Jordan
 Lebanon
 North Macedonia
 Mexico
 Morocco
 Philippines
 Palestinian Authority
 Serbia
 Singapore
 South Korea
 Southern African Customs Union
 Tunisia
 Turkey
 Ukraine

European Union

The European Union has bilateral agreements with the following countries and blocs: 
 Albania SAA (2009)
 Algeria AA (2005)
 Andorra CU (1991)
 Bosnia and Herzegovina SAA (2015)
 Canada: Comprehensive Economic and Trade Agreement (provisionally applied)
 Central America AA 
 Chile AA (2003)
 Egypt AA (2004)
 Faroe Islands, autonomous entity of Denmark (1997)
 Georgia AA/DCFTA (2014)
 Israel AA (2000)
 Japan EU-Japan Economic Partnership Agreement (2019)
 Jordan AA (2002)
 Lebanon AA (2006) 
 Macedonia SAA (2004)
 Mexico AA (2000)
 Montenegro SAA (2010)
 Monaco CU (1958, Franco-Monegasque Treaties)
 Morocco AA (2000)
 Palestinian Authority interim AA (1997)
 San Marino CU (2002)
 Serbia SAA (signed 2008, entry into force on 1 September 2013)
 South Africa AA (2000)
 South Korea: European Union–South Korea Free Trade Agreement (entered in to force on 13 December 2015)
 Switzerland FTA (1973)
 Tunisia AA (1998)
 Turkey CU (1996)
 EU Overseas Countries and Territories
Vietnam: European Union-Vietnam Free Trade Agreement (2020)
United Kingdom: European Union-United Kingdom Trade and Cooperation Agreement (entry into force 1 May 2021)

Faroe Islands
The Faroe Islands have bilateral agreements with the following countries and blocs:
 Switzerland
 Norway
 Iceland (The Hoyvík Agreement)
 The European Union
 Turkey (October 1, 2017)

Georgia

Georgia has bilateral free trade agreements with the following countries and blocs:

Armenia
Azerbaijan
China
EFTA (Iceland, Lichtenstein, Norway, Switzerland)
EU
Russia
Turkey
Turkmenistan
Ukraine
Uzbekistan

Gulf Cooperation Council
The Gulf Cooperation Council (GCC) has bilateral agreements with the following countries:
 EFTA (Entry into force: 1 July 2014)
 Singapore (Entry into force: 1 September 2013)

Hong Kong 
Hong Kong has bilateral free trade agreements with the following countries and blocs:

 Australia
 Chile
 China
 EFTA (Iceland, Lichtenstein, Norway, Switzerland)
 Georgia
 ASEAN
 Macau
 New Zealand

India

India has bilateral agreements with the following countries and blocs:

 Australia
 Bhutan
 Chile
 Japan
 Malaysia
 Nepal
 Singapore
 Sri Lanka
 South Korea
 Mauritius
 United Arab Emirates

Indonesia 
Indonesia has bilateral agreements with the following countries and blocs:

 Australia (Indonesia–Australia Comprehensive Economic Partnership Agreement, signed in 2019)
 Chile (Chile–Indonesia Comprehensive Economic Partnership Agreement, signed in 2017)
 EFTA (Indonesia–EFTA Comprehensive Economic Partnership, signed in 2018)
 Japan (Indonesia–Japan Economic Partnership Agreement, signed in 2007)
 Mozambique (Indonesia–Mozambique Preferential Trade Agreement, signed in 2019 but not yet in force as of 2020)
 Pakistan (Indonesia–Pakistan Preferential Trade Agreement, signed in 2012)
 Palestine (Indonesia–Palestine Trade Facilitation for Certain Products)
 South Korea (Indonesia–Korea Comprehensive Economic Partnership Agreement, signed in 2020)
 United Arab Emirates (Indonesia–UAE Comprehensive Economic Partnership Agreement, signed in 2022)

Israel

Israel has bilateral agreements with the following countries and blocs:
Canada – Canada–Israel Free Trade Agreement
Colombia
European Free Trade Association
European Union
Jordan
Mexico
Mercosur
Panama
South Korea
Turkey
Ukraine
United Arab Emirates
United Kingdom
United States – Israel–United States Free Trade Agreement

Japan
Japan has bilateral agreements with the following countries and blocs:
 ASEAN (Entry into force 2009)
 Australia (Entry into force 2015)
 European Union (EU–Japan Economic Partnership Agreement) (Entry into force in 2019)
 India (Entry into force in 2011)
 Indonesia (Japan–Indonesia Economic Partnership Agreement) (Entry into force in 2008)
 Malaysia (Entry into force in 2006)
 Mexico (Entry into force in 2005)
 Mongolia (Entry into force in 2016)
 Peru (Entry into force in 2012)
 Philippines (Entry into force in 2008)
 Singapore (Entry into force in 2002)
 Switzerland (Entry into force in 2009)
 Thailand (Japan–Thailand Economic Partnership Agreement) (Entry into force in 2007)
 Vietnam (Entry into force in 2009)
 United Kingdom (signed in 2020)
 United States (Entry into force in 2020)

Jordan
Jordan has bilateral agreements with the following countries and blocs:
 Canada
 Pakistan
 Algeria
 Libya
 Syria
 Kuwait
 Bahrain
 Peru
 United States (United States–Jordan Free Trade Agreement)
 The European Free Trade Association
 The European Union

Kazakhstan 
Kazakhstan has bilateral agreements with the following countries and blocs:

 Russia
 Ukraine
 Uzbekistan

Kyrgyz Republic
The Kyrgyz Republic has bilateral agreements with the following countries:
 Kazakhstan (Entry into force: 11 November 1995)
 Moldova (Entry into force: 21 November 1996)
 Russian Federation (Entry into force: 24 April 1993)
 Ukraine (Entry into force: 19 January 1998)
 Uzbekistan (Entry into force: 20 March 1998)

Lebanon
Lebanon has bilateral agreements with the following countries and blocs:
 Gulf Cooperation Council (GCC)
 Iraq
 European Union

Laos 
Laos has bilateral agreements with the following countries and blocs:

 Thailand

Malaysia
Malaysia has bilateral agreements with the following countries:
 India
 New Zealand
 Japan
 Pakistan
 Australia
Turkey
Chile

Maldives 

Maldives has bilateral agreements with the following countries:
South Asian Free Trade Area (Bangladesh, Bhutan, India, Nepal, Pakistan, Sri Lanka)

Mercosur 

 Israel
 Egypt
 Lebanon
 Palestine

Mexico

Mexico has bilateral agreements with the following countries and blocs: 
Free trade agreements
 NAFTA
 TPP
 Chile–Mexico Free Trade Agreement
 Colombia–Mexico Free Trade Agreement
 Costa Rica–Mexico Free Trade Agreement
 EFTA–Mexico Free Trade Agreement (Iceland, Liechtenstein, Norway, Switzerland)
 European Union–Mexico Economic Partnership
 Israel–Mexico Free Trade Agreement
 Japan–Mexico Economic Association Agreement
 Nicaragua–Mexico Free Trade Agreement
 Northern Triangle (El Salvador, Honduras and Guatemala)
 Panama
 Uruguay–Mexico Free Trade Agreement
Framework agreements
 MERCOSUR–Mexico Economic Association (Argentina, Brazil, Paraguay, Uruguay, Venezuela)
Preferential trade agreements
 Argentina
 Brazil
 Ecuador
 Paraguay
 Panama
 Peru

Micronesia 
Micronesia has bilateral agreements with the following countries and blocs:

 United States

Morocco
Morocco has bilateral agreements with the following countries and blocs:
 European Union
 European Free Trade Association
 Jordan
 Egypt
 Tunisia
 State of Palestine
 United Arab Emirates
 Turkey
 China
 United States

New Zealand
New Zealand free trade agreements:

 Australia (as Closer Economic Relations)
Malaysia
Singapore
Thailand
Chile
People's Republic of China (see China–New Zealand Free Trade Agreement)
Brunei (see Trans-Pacific Strategic Economic Partnership)
Hong Kong (see Hong Kong–New Zealand Closer Economic Partnership Agreement)
Taiwan

Pakistan
Pakistan has bilateral free trade agreements with:

 Afghanistan
 China 
 Indonesia
 Turkey

Panama
Panama has bilateral agreements with the following countries:
 Chile
 Costa Rica
 El Salvador
 Guatemala
 Honduras
 Israel
 Mexico
 Nicaragua
 Peru
 Republic of China (Taiwan)
 Singapore
 South Korea
 United States

Peru
Peru has bilateral agreements with the following countries:
 Canada
 Costa Rica
 EFTA
 People's Republic of China
 Japan
 Mexico
 Panama
 Singapore
 Thailand
 United States
 EU

Serbia
Serbia has bilateral agreements with the following countries and blocs:
 EU (SAA)
 EFTA
 CEFTA
 Russia
 Belarus
 Turkey
 Kazakhstan
 United States (GSP)

Singapore

Singapore has bilateral agreements with the following countries and blocs:
 Australia
 Brunei
 Chile
 Costa Rica
 Republic of China (Taiwan)
 European Free Trade Association
 Gulf Cooperation Council (GCC)
 India
 Japan
 Jordan
 New Zealand (separate from the Trans-Pacific Strategic Economic Partnership (see above) and is still in force)
 Panama
 Peru
 South Korea
 Sri Lanka
 People's Republic of China
 Turkey
 United Kingdom
 United States
 European Union
United Arab Emirates
Oman

South Korea

South Korea has bilateral agreements with the following countries and blocs:
 ASEAN
 Australia (see Korea–Australia Free Trade Agreement KAFTA)
 Canada (see South Korea–Canada Free Trade Agreement)
Central America (Costa Rica, El Salvador, Honduras, Nicaragua, Panama)
 China (see South Korea–China Free Trade Agreement)
 Chile
 Colombia
 Costa Rica
 EFTA
 European Union (European Union–South Korea Free Trade Agreement) (entered in to force on 13 December 2015)
 India (see Comprehensive Economic Partnership Agreement)
 Israel (see South Korea–Israel Free Trade Agreement) (signed on 12 May 2021)
 Indonesia
 New Zealand 
 Peru (see South Korea–Peru Free Trade Agreement)
Philippines
 Singapore
 Turkey 
 United Kingdom (enter in to force after Brexit)
 United States (see South Korea–US Free Trade Agreement)
 Vietnam

Switzerland
Switzerland (which has a customs union with Liechtenstein, sometimes included in agreements) has bilateral agreements with the following countries and blocs:
 Albania (Signed: 17.12.2009: Entry into force: 01.11.2010)
 Bosnia-Herzegovina (Entry into force: 01.01.2015)
 Canada (Entry into force 01.07.2009)
 Chile (Entry into force: 01.12.2004)
 People's Republic of China (Entry into force: July 1, 2014)
 Colombia (Signed: 25.11.2008. Entry into force: 01.07.2011)
 Costa Rica (Entry into force: 29.08.2014)
 Ecuador (Entry into force: 01.11.2020)
 Egypt (Entry into force: 01.09.2008)
 European Union (Entry into force: 01.01.1973; bilateral CH–EU)
 Faeroe Islands (Entry into force: 01.03.1995; bilateral CH–Faeroe)
 GCC (Entry into force: 01.07.2014)
 Georgia (Entry into force: 01.05.2018)
 Hong Kong (Entry into force: 01.10.2012)
 Indonesia (Entry into force: 01.11.2021)
 Israel (Entry into force: 01.07.1993)
 Japan (Entry into force: 01.09.2009. Bilateral CH–Japan)
 Jordan (Entry into force: 01.09.2002)
 Republic of Korea (Entry into force: 01.09.2006)
 Lebanon (Entry into force: 01.01.2007)
 North Macedonia (Entry into force: 01.05.2002)
Mexico (Entry into force: 01.07.2001)
Morocco (Entry into force: 01.12.1999)
Palestinian Authority (Entry into force: 01.07.1999)
Panama (Entry into force: 29.08.2014)
Peru (Signed: 24.06.2010 (EFTA) and 14.07.2010 (Peru). Entry into force on 01.07.2011)
Philippines (Entry into force: 01.06.2018)
Serbia (Signed: 17.12.2009: Entry into force: 01.10.2010)
Singapore (Entry into force: 01.01.2003)
SACU (Entry into force: 01.05.2008)
Tunisia (Entry into force: 01.06.2006)
Turkey (Entry into force: 01.04.1992)
Ukraine (Signed 24.06.2010. Entry into force 01.06.2012)
United Kingdom (Entry into force: 01.01.2021; bilateral CH–UK)

Taiwan, Republic of China
Republic of China (Taiwan) has bilateral agreements with the following countries:
 People's Republic of China, Economic Cooperation Framework Agreement
 El Salvador
 Guatemala
 Honduras
 New Zealand
 Singapore
 Panama

Tajikistan 
Tajikistan has bilateral agreements with the following countries and blocs:

 Belarus
 Ukraine
 Uzbekistan

Thailand
Thailand has bilateral agreements with the following countries and blocs:
 Australia
 India
 Japan (Japan–Thailand Economic Partnership Agreement signed in 2007)
 New Zealand
 Peru
 Chile

Tunisia
Tunisia has bilateral agreements with the following countries and blocs:
 Morocco
 European Free Trade Association
 Jordan
 Senegal
 Egypt
 Algeria
 Libya
 Mauritania
 Turkey
 European Union

Turkey 

Turkey has bilateral and multilateral agreements with:
 European Free Trade Association (September 1, 1992, updated June 25, 2018)
 European Union (December 31, 1995)
 Organization of the Black Sea Economic Cooperation
 Economic Cooperation Organization Trade Agreement
 Albania (May 1, 2008)
 Azerbaijan (February 25, 2020)
 Bosnia-Herzegovina (July 1, 2003)
 Chile (March 1, 2011)
 Egypt (March 1, 2007)
 Faroe Islands (October 1, 2017)
 Georgia (November 1, 2008)
 Israel (May 1, 1997)
 Kosovo (September 1, 2019)
 Macedonia (September 7, 1999)
 Malaysia (August 1, 2015)
 Mauritius (June 1, 2013)
 Moldova (November 1, 2016)
 Montenegro (March 1, 2010)
 Morocco (January 1, 2006)
 Palestinian Authority (July 20, 2004)
 North Macedonia (September 1, 2000)
 Serbia (September 1, 2010, updated June 1, 2019)
 Singapore (October 1, 2017)
 South Korea (May 1, 2013, updated August 1, 2018)
 Tunisia (July 1, 2005)
 Ukraine (February 3, 2022)
 United Kingdom (December 29, 2020)
 Venezuela (May 17, 2018)

United Kingdom

Andean Community Nations (Colombia, Ecuador and Peru)
Australia (signed in 2021)
Canada (signed in 2020)
CARIFORUM (Antigua and Barbuda, Bahamas, Barbados, Belize, Dominica, Grenada, Guyana, Haiti, Jamaica, Montserrat, Saint Kitts and Nevis, Saint Lucia, Saint Vincent and the Grenadines, Suriname, Trinidad and Tobago, Dominican Republic)
Central America (Costa Rica, El Salvador, Guatemala, Honduras, Nicaragua, Panama)
Chile
Denmark (Faroe Islands)
ESA (Eastern and Southern African Nations)
European Union (Trade Bloc) (TCA)
Georgia
Iceland and Norway
Israel
Côte d'Ivoire (signed in 2020)
Japan (signed in 2020)
Jordan
Kenya (signed in 2020)
Kosovo
Lebanon
Liechtenstein
Morocco
New Zealand (signed in 2022)
North Macedonia (signed in 2020)
Palestinian Authority
Papua New Guinea
Fiji
SACUM
South Korea
Switzerland
Tunisia
Ukraine
Singapore (signed in 2020)
Serbia (signed in 2021)
Vietnam (signed in 2020)
Mexico
Samoa
Moldova
Solomon Islands
Turkey
Cameroon
Ghana

Mutual recognition agreements:

Australia
New Zealand
United States

United States 

United States has bilateral agreements with the following countries and blocs:

Australia
Bahrain
Chile
Colombia
Costa Rica
Dominican Republic
El Salvador
Guatemala
Honduras
Israel
Japan (entry into force in 2020)
Jordan
Korea
Nicaragua
Oman
Panama
Peru
Morocco
Singapore

Vietnam 
See also: Vietnam free trade agreements

Vietnam has bilateral free trade agreements with the following countries and blocs:

 Japan (Entry into force in 2009) 
 Chile (Entry into force in 2014) 
 South Korea (Entry into force in 2015) 
 European Union (Entry into force in 2020) 
 United Kingdom (Entry into force in 2021)

Table (to be merged)

Signed agreements 
Agreements that have been negotiated and signed by the respective heads of states of each country, but not yet ratified by the country's legislative body.

Proposed bilateral agreements

List of agreements in negotiation. Agreements that are so far only discussed without any formal action by the parties involved are not listed.

 Andean Community
India
 ASEAN
Australia
New Zealand
 Australia
 ASEAN (negotiating alongside New Zealand for a proposed AFTA–AFTA-CER)
 United Arab Emirates
 People's Republic of China (Australia–China Free Trade Agreement)
 Canada is negotiating or planning bilateral trade agreements with:
Andean Community 
CARICOM  
 Guatemala, El Salvador, Honduras, and Nicaragua (Canada Central American Free Trade Agreement)
Dominican Republic  
EU
 Singapore (negotiations concluded, to be signed)
Japan
Joining the Trans-Pacific Strategic Economic Partnership
 Caribbean Community (CARICOM) – Canada to be negotiated, after Canada finishes their Central American Free Trade Agreement.
 Caribbean Community (CARICOM) – EU (on-going negotiation on the EPA) ("Economic Partnership Agreement")
 Caribbean Community (CARICOM) – MERCOSUR (Open for discussions in May 2005)
 Chile is negotiating or is planning bilateral agreements with the following countries and blocs:
 Guatemala
 India
 Nicaragua
 People's Republic of China is negotiating or is planning bilateral agreements with the following countries and blocs:
 Gulf Cooperation Council (GCC) – China–GCC Free Trade Agreement
 Israel – China–Israel Free Trade Agreement
 China–Japan–Korea Free Trade Agreement
 Norway – China–Norway Free Trade Agreement
 Sri Lanka – China–Sri Lanka Free Trade Agreement
Nepal – memorandum on a feasibility study currently in place
 Costa Rica
 EFTA
 South Korea
 Colombia is negotiating or is planning bilateral agreements with the following countries and blocs:
 Japan
 Turkey
 Eurasian Union is negotiating or is planning bilateral agreements with the following countries and blocs:
 ASEAN
 Cambodia
 Ecuador
 Egypt
 India
 Israel
 MERCOSUR
 Mongolia
 Serbia
 Singapore
 Tunisia
 EU is negotiating or is planning bilateral agreements with the following countries and blocs:
 ACP countries via Economic Partnership Agreements (EPA)
 European Union Economic Partnership Agreement with the Pacific ACP Countries (EU–PACP)
 Bosnia and Herzegovina Stabilisation and Association Agreement
 CACM + Panama
 Serbia Stabilisation and Association Agreement
 Albania Stabilisation and Association Agreement
 Syria European Union Association Agreement
 United States (TTIP)
 Mercosur
 Russia (EU–Russia Common Economic Space)
 Andean Community
 South Korea (European Union–Korea Free Trade Agreement)
 European Union Central American Association Agreement (EU–CAAA)
 EFTA is negotiating or is planning bilateral agreements with the following countries and blocs:
 Algeria
 Albania
 MERCOSUR
 Ukraine
 Gulf Cooperation Council (GCC)
EU
Mercosur
India
New Zealand
Turkey
 India
Australia (on negotiation)
Sri Lanka (separate from the South Asia Free Trade Agreement)
Chile (on negotiation)
New Zealand (on negotiation)
Hong Kong (on negotiation)
European Union (to be concluded before 2010 year end)
EFTA
Israel is negotiating or is planning bilateral agreements with the following countries and blocs:
China
Eurasian Economic Union
Guatemala
India
Vietnam
 Japan
 Gulf Cooperation Council
 Australia (Conducting feasibility study as of 19 September 2006).
 New Zealand – (Conducting feasibility study as of 14 May 2008)
 Jordan
Iraq
Palestinian Authority
Pakistan
 New Zealand
 United States
 South Korea
 Japan
 Hong Kong
 Cooperation Council for the Arab States of the Gulf
 Association of Southeast Asian Nations
 Peru
 Vietnam
 India
 Russia
 Peru
 Mexico
 Costa Rica
 Republic of China (Taiwan)
 Dominican Republic
 European Union
 India
 United States
 Russia
European Union
New Zealand
 Serbia is negotiating bilateral free trade agreements with the following countries and blocs:
 Ukraine
 Singapore  is negotiating bilateral free trade agreements with the following countries and blocs:
 EU (negotiations concluded, to be signed)
 Singapore – Canada
 Egypt
 Mexico
 Pakistan
 Panama
 Sri Lanka
 South Korea (Source: Ministry of Foreign Affairs and Trade, Minister for Trade – Free Trade Agreement Department) is negotiating or is planning bilateral agreements with the following countries and blocs:
 Mexico (SECA 3rd round of talks in 14~16 June 2006)
 Canada(10th round of talks in 23 April ~ 27 April 2007, Seoul)
 MERCOSUR (preparation study)
 People's Republic of China: China–South Korea Free Trade Agreement  (preparation study)
 Gulf Cooperation Council (GCC) (preparation study)
 Japan (negotiations at standstill)
 Switzerland is negotiating or is planning bilateral agreements with the following countries and blocs:
Russia/Belarus/Kazakhstan (Negotiations in preparation 2010, suspended)
MERCOSUR (In negotiations 2019)
Algeria (In negotiations 2010, suspended)
Thailand (In negotiations 2010)
Vietnam (Joint feasibility study 2010)
India (In negotiations 2010)
Guatemala (In negotiations 2014)
Honduras (In negotiations 2014, suspended)
Malaysia (In negotiations 2010)
Ukraine
Canada
European Union
Israel
Singapore
United States :
 Colombia Trade Promotion Agreement (2008?)
 Panama – United States Trade Promotion Agreement (2008?)
 United States–Thailand Free Trade Agreement (on hold since the 2006 Thai coup d'état)
 United States–New Zealand Free Trade Agreement
 United States–Ghana Free Trade Agreement
 United States–Indonesia Free Trade Agreement
 United States–Kenya Free Trade Agreement
 United States–Kuwait Free Trade Agreement (Expert-level trade talks held in February 2006) (part of US–MEFTA initiative)
 United States–Malaysia Free Trade Agreement (next meeting on January 14, 2008 in Kuala Lumpur)
 United States–Mauritius Free Trade Agreement
 United States–Mozambique Free Trade Agreement
 United States–United Arab Emirates Free Trade Agreement (5th round of talks are yet to be scheduled) (part of US–MEFTA initiative)
 United States–Southern African Customs Union Free Trade Agreement (on hold since 2006 due to US demands on intellectual property rights, government procurement rights and investment)
 United States–Ecuador Free Trade Agreement
 United States–Qatar Free Trade Agreement (on hold since 2006) (part of US–MEFTA initiative)

Defunct bilateral agreements
 Cobden–Chevalier Treaty Signed in 1860 by Britain and France. France ended the treaty in 1892 in favour of the Méline tariff
 Canada–U.S. Free Trade Agreement (superseded by North American Free Trade Agreement)
 Colombia–Mexico–Venezuela Free Trade Agreement (G-3) (Venezuela withdrew it)
 Costa Rica–Dominican Republic (superseded by DR–CAFTA)
 Costa Rica–Trinidad and Tobago (superseded by Costa Rica–CARICOM Free Trade Agreement)
 EU–Norway FTA (1973), now a member of the European Economic Area common market
 EU–Iceland FTA (1973), now a member of the EEA common market
 EU–Switzerland and Liechtenstein FTA (1973), Liechtenstein is now member of the EEA common market
 EU–Czech Republic EA (1995), now EU member
 EU–Estonia EA (1998), now EU member
 EU–Hungary EA (1994), now EU member
 EU–Latvia EA (1998), now EU member
 EU–Lithuania EA (1998), now EU member
 EU–Poland EA (1994), now EU member
 EU–Slovakia EA (1995), now EU member
 EU–Slovenia EA (1999), now EU member
 EU–Cyprus AA (1973), now EU member
 EU –Malta AA (1971), now EU member
 EU–Turkey AA (1964), superseded by EU–Turkey customs union
 Matrix of FTAs in the Balkans, in the framework of the Stability Pact for South Eastern Europe, now superseded by membership in CEFTA or (for Bulgaria and Romania) in the EU.  (2007)
 between each two of the following states (28 FTAs): Albania, Bosnia and Herzegovina, Bulgaria, Croatia, Macedonia, Moldova, Romania, Serbia and Montenegro
 UNMIK (as representative of Kosovo under Security Council resolution 1244) has bilateral agreements with the following countries and blocs:  (Now in CEFTA)
 Albania
 Bosnia and Herzegovina
 North Macedonia

See also

 Free-trade area
For an interactive list of bilateral and multilateral free trade instruments see the TREND-Analytics website.

References

External links
 bilaterals.org – "Everything that's not happening at the WTO"
 FTAs submitted to the WTO
 China FTA Network
 India's FTAs
 Americas FTAs
 World Bank FTA database
 EU FTAs
 EU-ACP countries Economic Partnership Agreements (EPA) Negotiations: Where do we stand?
 Singapore official FTA site 
 EFTA official site
 Australia official FTA site
 About.com's Pros & Cons of U.S. Free Trade Agreements
 Bilateral and Regional Trade Agreements Notified to the WTO: developed by WorldTradeLaw.net and Bryan Mercurio 
 U.S. bilateral trade agreements, from the Office of the United States Trade Representative
 Bilaterals.org, an activist group that works to oppose bilateral arrangements "that are opening countries to the deepest forms of penetration by transnational corporations"
 "Rise in Bilateral Free Trade Agreements." Council on Foreign Relations Backgrounder, June 13, 2006
 Switzerland official FTA site
 European Union–Vietnam Free Trade Agreement

International trade-related lists
 
 
Free trade bilateral